Be Vaghte Talagh is a film 2018 written and directed by Hassan Hajgozar.

Plot 

Cold and childless houses, beyond the splendor of a dream, rain falls, couples and cold houses are fighting over rain in the rain. Shahrokh is  satisfied and the butterfly is upset, the story there, the dream hotel, takes everyone with it, now the butterfly is satisfied with the rain and Shahrokh is unhappy on the verge of deception whether the rain comes or not, depending on the border he made and paid…

Cast 
 Pouria Poursorkh
 khatereh hatami
 Ramin Parchami
 Reza Rooygari
 Parastoo Salehi
 Farajolah Golsefidi
 Mohsen Iraji

References

External links 
 

2018 films
2018 thriller drama films
Iranian drama films
Persian-language films